Jason Pargin (born January 10, 1975), known by his former pen name David Wong, is an American humor writer. He is the former executive editor of humor website Cracked.com, a recurring guest in the Cracked Podcast, and has written six novels: John Dies at the End (2007), This Book Is Full of Spiders (2012), Futuristic Violence and Fancy Suits (2015), What the Hell Did I Just Read (2017), Zoey Punches the Future in the Dick (2020) and If This Book Exists, You're in the Wrong Universe (2022). John Dies at the End was adapted into a film of the same name in 2012.

Early life
Pargin was born in Lawrenceville, Illinois. He and fellow Internet writer John Cheese (real name Mack Leighty) attended high school together and met during an art class they shared. Pargin then attended the Southern Illinois University (SIU) radio-television program, graduating in 1997. While at SIU, he was part of a TV show on Alt.news cable TV called Consumer Advocate. A number of episodes were produced. He lived in Marion, Illinois until 2014, when he moved to Nashville.

PWOT and Cracked
In 1999, Pargin started his own humor site, Pointless Waste of Time (PWOT), which would eventually be absorbed into Cracked.com.

While working as a copy editor at a law firm, he would spend his days copy editing insurance claims and nights posting humor articles on PWOT.  Every Halloween on the site he wrote a new chapter of an online story that he published as a webserial. An estimated 70,000 people read the free online versions before they were removed in September 2008. Pargin used the feedback from people reading each episode of the webserial to tweak what would eventually become the book, John Dies at the End.

Demand Media hired Pargin to be the head editor for their revamped online magazine, Cracked.com, although Demand was not aware of Pargin's book deal.  As part of the deal, he merged PWOT into the Cracked forums. Pargin has described a disconnection between the old Cracked print magazine and the humor site Cracked.com due to multiple relaunches and almost entirely new staff. As a child, he read Cracked magazine's biggest competitor, Mad magazine.

In a popular article published at Cracked.com, Pargin coined the neologism "monkeysphere" which introduces the concept of Dunbar's number in a humorous manner. Pargin referred to Dunbar's number again in his novel, This Book Is Full of Spiders.

When Pargin started PWOT, he took on the pseudonym of David Wong to keep his real and online lives separate. Since much of his writing involved situations similar to his real life, he did not want co-workers and his employers to think that his rants about fictional characters were inspired by real people. The origin of the name was a character from one of his first short stories. He writes:

After his book and movie deal, his real name became common knowledge, but Pargin accepted it, saying, "It's not like I'm under the Witness Protection program or anything. I was just trying to keep things simple in my personal life."

In late 2020, Pargin announced that he was retiring the "David Wong" pseudonym, with future editions of his works being published under his real name instead.

Published works
His first novel John Dies at the End was at first rejected by publishers, and Pargin considered taking it down until indie horror publisher Permuted Press agreed to publish the novel in 2007.  A second edition by Thomas Dunne Books was published with additional material as a hardcover on September 29, 2009.  After enjoying some success, it came to the attention of Don Coscarelli, who decided to adapt it as a film. In 2007, Coscarelli optioned the film rights to John Dies at the End.  Filming took place from late 2010 until January 2011 at locations in Southern California.

The film, starring Chase Williamson, Rob Mayes, Clancy Brown, and Paul Giamatti, premiered at the Sundance Film Festival on January 23, 2012. It also played on March 12, 2012, at South by Southwest, in Austin, Texas.

The author stated in January 2018 that Zoey Punches the Future in the Dick, the sequel to Futuristic Violence and Fancy Suits, was nearing completion and scheduled for release in late 2020. 

The fourth book in the John Dies at the End series, If This Book Exists, You're in the Wrong Universe was released in October 2022.

Bibliography

John and Dave series

Zoey Ashe series

See also
Daniel O'Brien
Michael Swaim
Seanbaby

References

External links
 
 
 David Wong at film premiere
 

1975 births
American humorists
American columnists
Internet humor
21st-century American novelists
American male novelists
Novelists from Illinois
Living people
American comedy writers
Southern Illinois University alumni
People from Lawrenceville, Illinois
People from Marion, Illinois
Journalists from Illinois
21st-century American male writers
21st-century American non-fiction writers
American male non-fiction writers
21st-century pseudonymous writers